The 2010 Women's Indoor Pan American Cup was the 5th edition of the Indoor Pan American Cup, an indoor hockey competition. The tournament was held in Barquisimeto, Venezuela, from 9–15 August.

Defending champions Argentina won the tournament for the second time, defeating Uruguay 1–0 in penalties, after the final finished as a 1–1 draw. The United States won the bronze medal after defeating Trinidad and Tobago 2–1.

Teams
The following eight teams competed for the title:

Results

Preliminary round

Pool A

Pool B

Classification round

Fifth to eighth place classification

Seventh and eighth place

Fifth and sixth place

First to fourth place classification

Semi-finals

Third and fourth place

Final

Awards

Statistics

Final standings

Goalscorers

References

External links
Pan American Hockey Federation

Women's Indoor Pan American Cup
Indoor Pan American Cup
Indoor Pan American Cup
International field hockey competitions hosted by Venezuela
Indoor Pan American Cup
Sport in Barquisimeto
Indoor
Pan American Cup